Karapınar or Macarköy  (Hungarian: Feketeforrás or Magyarfalu (Madzsarköj)) is a Hungarian village in Turkey, at the Aegean shore. Karapınar is the new name of the village.

History
This village was established 420 years ago. The villagers were settled in the village when part of the Kingdom of Hungary was occupied by the Ottoman Empire.

See also
 Hungarians
 Magyarab

References

External links
 About the village 

Towns in Turkey